Statistical Modelling is a bimonthly peer-reviewed scientific journal covering statistical modelling. It is published by SAGE Publications on behalf of the Statistical Modelling Society. The editors-in-chief are Brian D. Marx (Louisiana State University), Vicente Núñez-Antón (University of the Basque Country), and Arnošt Komárek (Charles University in Prague).

Abstracting and indexing
The journal is abstracted and indexed in:
 Science Citation Index Expanded
 Scopus
 ProQuest databases
 EBSCO Information Services|EBSCO databases
According to the Journal Citation Reports, the journal has a 2014 impact factor of 0.977.

References

External links

SAGE Publishing academic journals
Bimonthly journals
Statistics journals
Publications established in 2007
English-language journals